Jared M. Young (born July 9, 1995) is a Canadian professional baseball second baseman and first baseman in the Chicago Cubs organization. He made his MLB debut in 2022.

Amateur career
Young attended Prince George Secondary School in Prince George, British Columbia and Kelowna Secondary School in Kelowna, British Columbia. Young attended Minot State University his freshman year of college. Young hit .398 with 5 home runs and 35 RBI for the Beavers, earning all-conference second-team honors. Young transferred to Connors State College for his sophomore season, hitting .480 with 11 home runs and 54 RBI. After graduating from Connors State, Young next attended Old Dominion University, where he played college baseball for the Monarchs. Young hit .367 with 7 home runs and 34 RBI, earning ABCA/Rawling All-American Third Team honors. Young was drafted by the Chicago Cubs in the 15th round, with the 465th overall selection, of the 2017 MLB draft.

Professional career
Young spent the 2017 season with the Eugene Emeralds, hitting .257/.311/.336/.647 with 1 home run and 15 RBI. He split the 2018 season between the South Bend Cubs and the Myrtle Beach Pelicans, hitting a combined .300/.357/.485/.842 with 16 home runs and 76 RBI. He was named the Cubs 2018 Minor League Player of the Year.

Young spent the 2019 season with the Tennessee Smokies, hitting .235/.287/.319/.606 with 5 home runs and 47 RBI. Following the 2019 season, Young played in the Arizona Fall League for the Mesa Solar Sox. Young did not play in a game in 2020 due to the cancellation of the minor league season because of the COVID-19 pandemic.

He split the 2021 season between Tennessee and the Triple-A Iowa Cubs, slashing .290/.361/.471 with 9 home runs and 40 RBI. In 2022, Young spent the year with Iowa, appearing in 109 games and hitting .230/.311/.420 with 17 home runs and 59 RBI.

On September 14, 2022, Young's contract was selected from Triple-A Iowa. He was sent outright off the 40-man roster on October 11, 2022.

References

External links

Minot State Beavers bio
Old Dominion Monarchs bio

1995 births
Living people
Sportspeople from Prince George, British Columbia
Canadian expatriate baseball players in the United States
Canadian expatriate baseball players in the Dominican Republic
Baseball people from British Columbia
Major League Baseball infielders
Chicago Cubs players
Connors State Cowboys baseball players 
Old Dominion Monarchs baseball players
Eugene Emeralds players
South Bend Cubs players
Myrtle Beach Pelicans players
Tennessee Smokies players
Mesa Solar Sox players
Iowa Cubs players
Tigres del Licey players
2023 World Baseball Classic players